South Dakota Highway 71 (SD 71) is a  state highway in Fall River County, South Dakota, United States, that travels from the Nebraska state line (where it continues as N-2/N-71 through the Black Hills National Forest) to U.S. Route 18 Bypass (US 18 Byp.) in Hot Springs. It is part of a triple state highway serving South Dakota, Nebraska, and Colorado.

Route description
SD 71's southern terminus is at the Nebraska border in Black Hills National Forest where it has the same number.

In the forest, the route meets the terminus of South Dakota Highway 471. After that, it leaves the forest and ends at US 18 Byp. in Hot Springs.

History
The road was originally commissioned in 1936 as part of South Dakota Highway 87.  Part of that highway was given the SD 71 designation in 1962.

Major intersections

See also

 List of state highways in South Dakota

References

External links

071
Transportation in Fall River County, South Dakota